Kazimiera Szczuka (born 22 June 1966 in Warsaw) is a Polish historian of literature, literary critic, feminist, journalist and television personality, known from the Polish edition of The Weakest Link.

Life and career
She was born on 22 June 1966 to father Stanisław Szczuka, a lawyer and a political dissident in the times of PRL, and mother Janina (née Winawer), a doctor from an assimilated Polish-Jewish family. She is a great-great-granddaughter of chess player Szymon Winawer. She is a graduate of the University of Warsaw where she obtained her MA degree under supervision of Maria Janion.

She published articles in such newspapers and magazines as Gazeta Wyborcza, Res Publica Nova, Teksty Drugie and Zadra. She also taught gender studies at the Institute of Literary Research of the Polish Academy of Sciences (PAN). She has collaborated with the Krytyka Polityczna circle of intellectuals and Feminoteka women's rights organization.

In 2003, she was one of the host of the Pegaz culture programme aired on the Polish state-run television Telewizja Polska (TVP). She was dismissed by TVP after she publicly used swear words in a live interview with Manuela Gretkowska.
 
In 2004, she published her book Milczenie owieczek (The Silence of Little Lambs) in which discussed such topics as the right to abortion, birth control and sex education.

Szczuka is a member of the Greens 2004 party, advocate of LGBT rights and supporter of pro-choice rights for women. She is a member of the Programme Council of the green political foundation the Green Institute.

She works for TVN24 in Wydanie drugie poprawione. She has worked since 2003 for TVN in Najsłabsze Ogniwo (the Polish version of The Weakest Link) and in Dwururka. She has also appeared as a juror on Top Model TV show and as an expert on the Milionerzy game show.

In September 2022, she became a host of the popular RMF FM Afternoon Talk Show (Popołudniowa rozmowa RMF FM) broadcast on the RMF FM radio station.

Controversy
In March 2006, Szczuka satirized on a TV programme Magdalena Buczek, a young woman who frequently recites prayers on Radio Maryja, claiming to not know that the woman "suffered from a crippling disease and used a wheelchair." Despite Szczuka's public apology, she was found guilty of "insulting a disabled person and mocking her religion" by the Polish National Broadcasting Council, and the station on which she had appeared was fined 500,000 PLN.

Szczuka complained later, "They hate me because I'm a feminist, I'm Jewish – mostly because I'm a feminist" in an interview for The New York Times and International Herald Tribune.

Selected publications 
Kopciuszek, Frankenstein i inne ("Cinderella, Frankenstein and Others"), Kraków, 2001
Milczenie owieczek. Rzecz o aborcji, Warsaw, 2004
Duża książka o aborcji (co-written with Katarzyna Bratkowska); Warsaw 2011
Janion. Transe – traumy – transgresje. 1: Niedobre dziecię (co-written with Maria Janion; Warsaw 2012
Janion. Transe – traumy – transgresje. 2: Profesor Misia (co-written with Maria Janion); Warsaw 2012

See also
Feminism in Poland

References

External links
Szczuka's profile on the website of the Polish version of The Weakest Link  
Green Institute

1966 births
The Greens (Poland) politicians
Living people
Jewish feminists
Polish literary critics
Polish women literary critics
Jewish Polish politicians
Writers from Warsaw
Polish feminists
Polish television personalities
Polish LGBT rights activists